Martín Cuestas Cardozo (born 8 December 1986) is a Uruguayan long distance runner who specialises in the marathon. He competed in the men's marathon event at the 2016 Summer Olympics.

His twin brother Nicolás also specialises in marathon.

References

External links
 

1986 births
Living people
Uruguayan male long-distance runners
Uruguayan male marathon runners
Place of birth missing (living people)
Athletes (track and field) at the 2016 Summer Olympics
Olympic athletes of Uruguay